Adavukal Pathinettu is a 1978 Indian Malayalam film,  directed by Vijay Anand and produced by C. V. Hariharan and R. S. Prabhu. The film stars Jayan, Ravikumar, Jayabharathi  and Kanakadurga in the lead roles. The film has musical score by A. T. Ummer.

Cast
Ravikumar as Ravi
Seema
Jayan as Shekharan Kutty
Sankaradi as Shekharan Kutty's Father
Prathapachandran as Jaya's Father
Kanakadurga as Bhavani amma
Kunchan as Pappu
Kuthiravattam Pappu as Vasu
Veeran

Soundtrack
The music was composed by A. T. Ummer and the lyrics were written by Bichu Thirumala.

References

External links
 

1978 films
1970s Malayalam-language films